Didu may refer to:
 Didu (woreda), a woreda (district) in Oromia Region, Ethiopia
 Didu, Iran, a village in Chahardangeh Rural District, Chahardangeh District, Sari County, Mazandaran Province, Iran
 Didu, Guangdong (地都), a town in Rongcheng District, Jieyang, Guangdong, China

See also
Yue opera, a Chinese opera genre, formerly known as Didu song (的篤班)